Balș or Bals may refer to:

Places 
Balș, a town in Olt County, Romania
Balș, a commune in Iași County, Romania
Ballsh, a town in Albania

People 
Gert Bals (1936–2016), Dutch footballer
Gheorghe Balș (1868–1934), Romanian engineer, architect and art historian
Grigore Balș (died 1895), Moldavian-born Romanian politician
Huub Bals (1937–1988), Dutch film festival director
Matei Balș (1905–1989), Romanian bacteriologist
Sara Bals (born 1977), Belgian nanoscientist
Teodor Balș (1805–1857), ruler of Moldavia

Other 
BALS Corporation